William Adam was an early twentieth-century Scottish association football forward who played nine seasons in the American Soccer League.

In 1921, Adam joined St Mirren F.C.  He left the team and Scotland during the 1922-1923 season to sign with J&P Coats of the American Soccer League.  Adam remained with J&P Coat until 1931, the last two seasons with team was known as Pawtucket Rangers.

References

External links
 
 St Mirren Player Profiles

American Soccer League (1921–1933) players
J&P Coats players
Pawtucket Rangers players
Scottish expatriate footballers
St Mirren F.C. players
Association football forwards
Scottish expatriate sportspeople in the United States
Expatriate soccer players in the United States
Year of birth missing
Year of death missing
Footballers from Paisley, Renfrewshire
Scottish footballers